Taje (Aje), or Petapa (Tapa), is a Celebic language of Sulawesi in Indonesia. Taje is a minority language with a small population of speakers, and is spoken in the Tanampedagi and Petapa villages in Central Sulawesi.

References

Tomini–Tolitoli languages
Languages of Sulawesi